Dame Kathleen Dethridge, DBE (née Caldon; born 1962), known as Kate Dethridge, is a British educator.

Biography 
Kathleen Caldon was born in Barking, Essex, in 1962, the daughter of Frederick and Patricia Caldon. After attending Brentwood Ursuline Convent, she studied at Durham University, graduating with a Bachelor of Arts degree in Geography. She subsequently received a postgraduate certificate in education from the University.

Caldon became a teacher in 1985 and married Rod Dethridge the following year. In 1988, she became a deputy head teacher and in 1998 became head teacher of Churchend Primary School in Reading. She was an Ofsted Inspector from 2000 and has sat on several of its reform groups since 2011; she was also a school improvement adviser between 2005 and 2010, was made a national leader of education in 2008, and was an associate director of the National Education Trust from 2011. She was also a founding trustee if the College of Teaching. In 2015 she published 'A Practical Guide to the Early Years Foundation Stage. Additionally in 2015, she was appointed a Dame Commander of the Order of the British Empire (DBE).
In 2020, Kate became Regional Schools Commissioner for North West London and South Central England.

References 

1962 births
Living people
People from Barking, London
People educated at Brentwood Ursuline Convent High School
Alumni of Trevelyan College, Durham
Schoolteachers from Essex
Dames Commander of the Order of the British Empire